Danny Dalla-Longa (born November 6, 1953) is a politician and businessman from Alberta, Canada.

Dalla-Longa was elected to the Legislative Assembly of Alberta as a liberal member for Calgary-West in 1993. This was seen as a major upset as Calgary West was the former stronghold of Premier Peter Lougheed. Dalla-Longa served for one term in the assembly and did not run again.

Dalla-Longa is an officer of a company in Calgary called i3 Capital Partners Inc., a merchant bank focused on the energy and technology industries.

References

External links 
 Our People at i3 Capital Partners Inc.

Living people
Alberta Liberal Party MLAs
People from Medicine Hat
1953 births